Torpedo Squadron is a 1942 American short documentary film shot by John Ford while he was on the island of Midway.

See also
 List of Allied propaganda films of World War II

References
Notes

Footnotes

Bibliography

External links

Complete film at Archive.org

1942 films
1940s short documentary films
Black-and-white documentary films
1942 short films
American short documentary films
American World War II propaganda shorts
Documentary films about military aviation
Films directed by John Ford
Unreleased American films
Documentary films about World War II
American black-and-white films
1940s English-language films
1940s American films